Negative may refer to:

Science and mathematics 
 Negative number
 Negative mass
 Negative energy
 Negative charge, one of the two types of electric charge
 Negative (electrical polarity), in electric circuits
 Negative result (disambiguation)
 Negative lenses, uses to describe diverging optics

Photography 
 Negative (photography), an image with inverted luminance or a strip of film with such an image
 Original camera negative, the film in a motion picture camera which captures the original image
 Paper negative, a negative image printed on paper used to create the final print of a photograph

Linguistics 
 A negative answer, commonly expressed with the word no
 A type of grammatical construction; see affirmative and negative
A double negative is a construction occurring when two forms of grammatical negation are used in the same sentence.

Music 
 Negative (Finnish band), a Finnish band established in 1997
 Negative (Serbian band), a Serbian band established in 1999
 The Negatives, a band fronted by Lloyd Cole
 Negative (Yōsui Inoue album), 1987
 Negative (Negative album), 1999
 Negatives (album), a 2004 album by Phantom Planet
 The Negatives, a 2014 album by Cruel Hand
 Negative (song), a 1998 song by Mansun
Negative (album) by Act Of Denial

Film
 Negatives (film), a 1968 film

Other uses 
 Photo negative casting, a casting technique in acting by reversing the skin colours of actor and character.
 Negative sign, the passive or feminine signs of the zodiac in astrology
 Negative space, in art, the space around or between elements of the subject
 Negative (policy debate) (NEG), the team which negates the resolution in policy debate
 Negative feedback, a feedback loop that responds in the opposite direction to a perturbation
 Negative repetition, the performance of the eccentric phase of weight lifting
 Negative liberty is freedom from interference by other people
 Negative, several distinct concepts within the game of contract bridge, including:
 Double negative, see Glossary of contract bridge terms#doublenegative
 Herbert negative, see Glossary of contract bridge terms#herbertnegative
 Negative double
 Negative free bid
 Negative inference, see Glossary of contract bridge terms#negativeinference
 Negative response, see Glossary of contract bridge terms#negativeresponse

See also 
 Mu (negative)
 Negation (disambiguation)
 Negativity (disambiguation)
 Positive (disambiguation)
 Double Negative (disambiguation)